Errantia is a diverse group of marine polychaete worms in the phylum Annelida. Traditionally a subclass of the paraphyletic class Polychaeta, it is currently regarded as a monophyletic group within the larger Pleistoannelida, composed of Errantia and Sedentaria. These worms are found worldwide in marine environments and brackish water.

Phylogeny
The phylogeny of polychaetes is slowly being resolved. Errantia and Sedentaria are the two biggest clades of polychaetes, and together they compose clade Pleistoannelida. Two groups are nested within Errantia: Aciculata (Eunicida + Phyllodocida) and Protodriliformia (small meiofaunal worms such as the Protodrilida).

Historically, the order Amphinomida was part of this subclass. However, phylogenetic analyses place Amphinomida inside a basal clade with Sipunculida and Lobatocerebrum, and this clade is the sister group to Pleistoannelida.

Some taxa, such as Spintheridae and Myzostomida, are still difficult to place due to their long branching, but they likely belong to either Errantia or Sedentaria.

Classification

Historical
Errantia is, along with Sedentaria, one of the two old orders of the paraphyletic class "Polychaeta". In 1977 the zoologist Kristian Fauchald split Errantia into three orders: Phyllodocida, Amphinomida and Eunicida, giving way to this classification.
Order Amphinomida – 2 families (Amphinomidae, Euphrosinidae)
Order Eunicida
Superfamily Eunicea – 7 families (Onuphidae, Eunicidae, Lumbrineridae, Iphitimidae, Arabellidae, Lysaretidae, Dorvilleidae)
Superfamily incertae sedis – 2 families (Histriobdellidae, Ichthytomidae)
Order Phyllodocida
Suborder Phyllodociformia – 4 families (Phyllodocidae, Alciopidae, Lopadorhynchidae, Pontodoridae)
Suborder Aphroditiformia
Superfamily Aphroditacea – 6 families (Aphroditidae, Polynoidae, Polyodontidae, Pholoididae, Eulepethidae, Sigalionidae)
Superfamily Chrysopetalacea – 2 families (Chrysopetalidae, Palmyridae)
Superfamily Pisionacea – 1 family (Pisionidae)
Suborder Nereidiformia – 6 families (Hesionidae, Pilargiidae, Syllidae, Calamyzidae, Nereidae, Antonbmunidae)
Suborder Glyceriformia – 3 families (Glyceridae, Goniadidae, Lacydoniidae)
Suborder incertae sedis – 5 families (Iospilidae, Nephtyidae, Sphaerodoridae, Tomoptendae, Typhloscolecidae)

References

 
Protostome subclasses